The Liberty Statue or Freedom Statue is a monument on the Gellért Hill in Budapest, Hungary. It commemorates those who sacrificed their lives for the independence, freedom, and prosperity of Hungary.

History 
It was first erected in 1947 in remembrance of the Soviet liberation of Hungary during World War II, which ended the occupation by Nazi Germany. Its location upon Gellért Hill makes it a prominent feature of Budapest's cityscape.

The 14 m tall bronze statue stands atop a 26 m pedestal and holds a palm leaf. Two smaller statues are also present around the base, but the original monument consisted of two more originally that have since been removed from the site and relocated to Statue Park. The monument was designed by Zsigmond Kisfaludi Strobl. According to Kisfaludi Strobl, the design was originally made for the memorial of István Horthy and would in that role have featured a human child instead of the palm leaf that was a Soviet addition.

At the time of the monument's construction, the defeat of Axis forces by the Red Army was officially proclaimed “liberation”—leading to the original inscription upon the memorial (both in Hungarian and Russian):

A FELSZABADÍTÓ
SZOVJET HŐSÖK
EMLÉKÉRE
A HÁLÁS MAGYAR NÉP
1945

which can be translated to read, "To the memory of the liberating Soviet heroes [erected by] the grateful Hungarian people [in] 1945".

Over the following years, public sentiment toward the Soviets decreased to the point of revolution, which was attempted and temporarily succeeded in 1956 and subsequently damaged some portions of the monument.  After the 1989 transition from communist rule to democracy, the inscription was modified to read:

MINDAZOK EMLÉKÉRE

AKIK
ÉLETÜKET ÁLDOZTÁK
MAGYARORSZÁG
FÜGGETLENSÉGÉÉRT,
SZABADSÁGÁÉRT
ÉS BOLDOGULÁSÁÉRT

Translated from Hungarian: "To the memory of those all who sacrificed their lives for the independence, freedom, and prosperity of Hungary". The Russian-language version of the tribute was removed in its entirety.

See also

Hungary during World War II
People's Republic of Hungary
Hungarian Revolution of 1956
List of tallest statues

References

Monuments and memorials in Hungary
Buildings and structures in Budapest
Soviet military memorials and cemeteries
Hungary–Soviet Union relations
History of Budapest
1947 sculptures
Tourist attractions in Budapest
Victory monuments